Estadio Metropolitano Ciudad de Itagüí is a multi-use stadium in Itagüí, Colombia.  It is currently used mostly for football matches by Leones F.C., currently playing in Categoría Primera B. The stadium has a capacity of 12,000 spectators.

References

Football venues in Colombia
Itagüí
Buildings and structures in Antioquia Department
Sports venues completed in 1994
1994 establishments in Colombia